Matthew Arnot (born 21 October 1993) is a former professional Australian rules footballer who played for the Richmond Football Club in the Australian Football League (AFL).

Arnot was recruited from the Oakleigh Chargers in the TAC Cup with the 55th selection in the 2011 AFL Draft.  He made his AFL debut in round 14 of the 2013 AFL season against , where his strong tackling was a standout feature. He was delisted at the conclusion of the 2015 season.

References

External links

1993 births
Living people
Richmond Football Club players
Oakleigh Chargers players
Coburg Football Club players
Port Melbourne Football Club players
Australian rules footballers from Victoria (Australia)